Delta is a railway and metro station in the municipality of Auderghem/Oudergem, in the eastern part of Brussels, Belgium. It is located near the intersection of the / and the / and provides access to the adjacent Plaine campus of the Université libre de Bruxelles (ULB) and to the Etterbeek campus of the Vrije Universiteit Brussel (VUB).

The station was inaugurated on 20 September 1976, as part of the first heavy metro segment of the network, located on the branch from Mérode to Beaulieu, which is now a part of line 5.

Metro station
Delta is notable for being the only station in the Brussels Metro network to be named after a feature of itself rather than after a street name, neighborhood, or other adjacent location: The name derives from the triangular shape of the maintenance complex as seen from the air, which is reminiscent of the Greek capital letter Delta (Δ).

The station is the site of the primary maintenance facility for all heavy metro rolling stock. Because of this, Delta originates the Brussels Metro's earliest services in the morning and is also the last station where metro trains terminate at night. The maintenance complex also services a large fleet of buses.

Railway station

The main railway station, located within the same complex, encompasses two platforms and is served by the suburban services the National Railway Company of Belgium (NMBS/SNCB)'s line 26 linking Vilvoorde with Halle via Etterbeek. There is a direct link between the metro and railway tracks within the station, enabling transportation of metro rolling stock by way of the Belgian rail network.

Train services
The station is served by the following service(s):
 Brussels RER services (S4) Vilvoorde - Merode - Etterbeek - Brussels-Luxembourg - Denderleeuw - Aalst (weekdays, peak hours only)
 Brussels RER services (S7) Mechelen - Merode - Halle (weekdays)

External links

Brussels metro stations
Railway stations in Brussels
Railway stations opened in 1976
Auderghem